The Arado E.530 was a proposed twin-engine Schnellbomber design by Arado Flugzeugwerke. It was to have a pressurized cockpit in the port fuselage and contained one 500 kg bomb, but was otherwise unarmed. It was abandoned due to having no advantage over the Messerschmitt equivalent.

References

Arado aircraft